Tillandsia leonamiana is a species in the genus Tillandsia. This species is native to Brazil.

Cultivars
 Tillandsia 'Ed Doherty'
 Tillandsia 'Mariposa'

References

BSI Cultivar Registry Retrieved 11 October 2009

leonamiana
Flora of Brazil